Ricardo Brown may refer to:

Ricardo Brown (basketball) (born 1957), former Philippine Basketball Association player
Ricardo Brown (boxer) (born 1990), Jamaican boxer
Ricardo Brown (journalist), Cuban-born television journalist
Ricardo Emmanuel Brown (born 1972), birth name of American rapper Kurupt